is a railway station on the Isumi Line in Isumi, Chiba Japan, operated by the third-sector railway operator Isumi Railway.

Lines
Kugahara Station is served by the single-track Isumi Line, and lies 20.8 km from the eastern terminus of the line at Ōhara Station.

Station layout
The station has a simple side platform serving a bidirectional single track, with a three-sided rain shelter built onto the platform. The station is unstaffed.

Platforms

Adjacent stations

History

Kugahara Station opened on June 20, 1960, as a station on the Japanese National Railways (JNR) Kihara Line. With the division and privatization of JNR on April 1, 1987, the station was acquired by East Japan Railway Company (JR East). On March 24, 1988, the Kihara Line became the Isumi Railway Isumi Line. Since July 1, 2009 the station has been nicknamed Saniku Gakuin Kugahara after the nearby Saniku Gakuin College, and the station signage was changed to reflect this.

Surrounding area

 Saniku Gakuin College
 National Route 297
 National Route 465

See also
 Kugahara Station (Tokyo) in Tokyo

External links

 Isumi Railway station information 

Railway stations in Chiba Prefecture
Railway stations in Japan opened in 1960